Michael Darren Hall (born July 14, 1964) is an American former professional baseball pitcher. He played in Major League Baseball (MLB) for the Toronto Blue Jays and Los Angeles Dodgers.

External links

1964 births
Living people
Dallas Baptist Patriots baseball players
Major League Baseball pitchers
Los Angeles Dodgers players
Baseball players from Ohio
People from Marysville, Ohio
Medicine Hat Blue Jays players
Knoxville Blue Jays players
Dunedin Blue Jays players
Syracuse Chiefs players
Yakima Bears players
San Antonio Missions players
San Bernardino Stampede players